The 2007 Premier Hockey League Season was the third season of the Premier Hockey League, and was played in two phases in Chennai and Chandigarh. 7 teams participated: Orissa Steelers, Sher-e-Jalandhar, Bangalore Lions, Hyderabad Sultans, Maratha Warriors, Chandigarh Dynamos and Chennai Veerans. Orissa Steelers won the title in 2007. Sher-e-Jalandhar was the runners up.

Teams
Orissa Steelers won the PHL 2007 against Sher-e-Jalandhar by beating them by 4-3 in third final.

In the 2007 edition the organisers will eliminate tier 2 and play all the teams in single tier. Also the number of teams will be reduced from 11 teams to 7. Delhi Dazzlers, Bengal Tigers, Lucknow Nawabs, and Imphal Rangers were dropped for the 2007 season.

Tier-1 
Bangalore Lions
Chandigarh Dynamos
Hyderabad Sultans
Sher-e-Jalandhar
Orissa Steelers
Maratha Warriors
Chennai Veerans

Premier Hockey League seasons
India
hockey